Theodore Moyle Burton (March 27, 1907 – December 22, 1989) was a general authority of the Church of Jesus Christ of Latter-day Saints (LDS Church) and one of the main leaders of the Genealogical Department of the church in the 1960s. Under his direction the department expanded its operations, largely through the opening of many more Family History Centers.

Burton was born in Salt Lake City, Utah. From 1927 to 1930 he served as a missionary in the Swiss-German Mission of the LDS Church. As a youth, Burton became the first Eagle Scout in the Pioneer Stake of the LDS Church.

In 1933 he married Minnie Susan Preece. In 1934, Burton received a bachelor's degree and a master's degree from the University of Utah, where he became a Sigma Chi. He worked for the treasury attache at the U.S. embassies in both Vienna and Berlin. He later taught at Carbon College and Utah State Agricultural College. He returned to Purdue University where he earned a Ph.D. in chemistry in 1951. He returned to Utah State, but in 1957 was called as president of the West German Mission of the church.

In 1960, Burton was called as an Assistant to the Quorum of the Twelve Apostles. He served in this position until it was disbanded in 1976; he and the other Assistants were subsumed by the First Quorum of the Seventy. During the 1950s, Burton had served as bishop of the Logan 4th Ward prior to becoming a mission president.

Burton served as president of the European Mission of the church and later as the Area Supervisor in Europe.

As director of the Genealogical Department, Burton initiated the translation of materials into languages other than English. He held the title of executive director of the Genealogical Department from 1972 to 1978. He also negotiated the contracting out of microfilming work to a private company in 1967 and then its later resumption as a function of the church department.

Notes

References
"Elder Theodore M. Burton Dies", Ensign, March 1990
Allen, James B., Jessie L. Embry and Kahlile B. Mehr. Hearts Turned to the Fathers: A History of the Genealogical Society of Utah, 1894-1994. Provo: BYU Studies, 1995.
Encyclopedia of Latter-day Saint Church History, pp. 156–157
2005 Deseret News Church Almanac, p. 79.

External links
Grampa Bill's G.A. Pages: Theodore M. Burton

1907 births
1989 deaths
20th-century Mormon missionaries
American genealogists
American Mormon missionaries in Germany
Assistants to the Quorum of the Twelve Apostles
College of Eastern Utah faculty
Genealogy and the Church of Jesus Christ of Latter-day Saints
Members of the First Quorum of the Seventy (LDS Church)
Mission presidents (LDS Church)
American Mormon missionaries in Switzerland
Writers from Salt Lake City
Purdue University alumni
University of Utah alumni
Utah State University faculty
American general authorities (LDS Church)
20th-century American historians
20th-century American male writers
People from Salt Lake City
American expatriates in Austria
Latter Day Saints from Utah
Latter Day Saints from Indiana
American male non-fiction writers